Leandro Rodrigues Tavares (born 25 January 1975), also known as Leandro Tavares, is a retired football midfielder who played for several clubs in the Campeonato Brasileiro Série A and the Mexican Primera División. He also participated for Brazil at the 1991 FIFA U-17 World Championship finals in Italy.

Career
Born in Belo Horizonte, Leandro Tavares began playing professional football with Clube Atlético Mineiro. He was loaned to Esporte Clube Democrata and Sport Club do Recife before he signed with Coritiba Foot Ball Club in 2000. After his first season, Coritiba loaned him to Sport Club Internacional and Sociedade Esportiva Matonense.

In 2003, he moved to Mexico to play for Colibríes de Morelos.

Leandro Tavares finished his career in Brazil playing for Brasiliense Futebol Clube and Ceilândia Esporte Clube.

References

External links
 
 
 
 Profile at Ceilandiaec.com.br

1975 births
Living people
Brazilian footballers
Brazil youth international footballers
Brazilian expatriate footballers
Clube Atlético Mineiro players
Esporte Clube Democrata players
Sport Club do Recife players
Coritiba Foot Ball Club players
Sport Club Internacional players
Brasiliense Futebol Clube players
Ceilândia Esporte Clube players
Campeonato Brasileiro Série A players
Liga MX players
Expatriate footballers in Mexico
Association football midfielders
Footballers from Belo Horizonte